Nikolay Sorokin (born 23 July 1982) is a Russian handball player for Russian club HC Kaustik Volgograd. He also played for the Russian national team.

References

1982 births
Living people
Russian male handball players
HC Motor Zaporizhia players
Sportspeople from Volgograd